The 1930 Notre Dame Fighting Irish football team was an American football team that represented the University of Notre Dame as an independent during the 1930 college football season. In their 13th and final season under head coach Knute Rockne, the Fighting Irish compiled a perfect 10–0 record and outscored their opponents by a total of 256 to 74 with three shutouts.

The Dickinson System ranked Notre Dame No. 1 with 25.13 points, ahead of No. 2 Washington State (20.44) and No. 3 Alabama (20.18). Later analyses also rated Notre Dame as the 1940 national champion, including Billingsley Report, Boand System, Dunkel System, Helms Athletic Foundation, Houlgate System, National Championship Foundation, Parke H. Davis, and Poling System.

The new Notre Dame Stadium made its debut on October 4; it was dedicated the  The closest game was a one-point win in late November over previously undefeated Army; the Irish won the annual rivalry game, 7–6, at Soldier Field in Chicago with over 100,000 in attendance. A week later in Los Angeles, Notre Dame shut out once-beaten USC, 27–0, for their 19th consecutive victory.

Two Notre Dame players, quarterback Frank Carideo and halfback Marchy Schwartz, were consensus first-team players on the 1930 All-America college football team. Other Notre Dame players receiving 1930 All-America honors included guard Bert Metzger (first-team selection by the Associated Press and United Press); halfback Marty Brill (first-team selection by the All-America Board); end Tom Conley (second-team selection by the Associated Press, United Press, and Newspaper Enterprise Association); fullback Joe Savoldi (second-team selection by the Associated Press); and tackle Al Culver (second-team selection by the United Press).

Four months after the season ended, on March 31, 1931, Rockne and seven others were killed when a Transcontinental and Western Airline plane crashed in Kansas as Rockne traveled from Kansas City to California.

Schedule

Personnel

Players
The following players participated on the 1930 Notre Dame football team.

 Roy Bailie, left end
 Marty Brill, right halfback, All-American
 Frank Butler, center
 Frank Carideo, quarterback, All-American and College Football Hall of Fame
 Norbert Christman, quarterback
 Tom Conley, captain and right end
 Carl Cronin, quarterback, College Football Hall of Fame
 Al Culver, left tackle
 Dick Donoghue, right tackle
 Norman Greeney, left guard
 Dan Hanley, fullback
 James Harriss, left guard
 Frank Hoffman, left tackle
 Paul Host, left end
 Al Howard, fullback
 Charles Jaskwhich, quarterback
 Clarence Kaplan, right halfback
 Thomas Kassis, left guard
 Frank Kerjes, right guard
 Mike Koken, left halfback
 Ed Kosky, left end
 Joe Kurth, right tackle
 Bernie Leahy, left halfback
 Frank Leahy, left tackle, College Football Hall of Fame
 Richard Mahoney, right end
 Arthur McManmon, right tackle
 Regis McNamara, left tackle
 Bert Metzger, right guard, All-American and College Football Hall of Fame
 Larry Mullins, fullback
 Emmett Murphy, quarterback
 John O'Brien, left end
 Paul O'Connor, right halfback
 Bill Pierce, right guard
 John Rogers, center
 Joe Savoldi, fullback
 Marchmont Schwartz, left halfback, All-American and College Football Hall of Fame
 Joseph Sheeketski, right halfback
 Fred Staab, fullback
 Robert Terlaak, right guard
 George Vlk, right end
 Thomas Yarr, center

Staff

 Knute Rockne, head coach and director of athletics, College Football Hall of Fame
 Hunk Anderson, assistant coach, College Football Hall of Fame
 Jack Chevigny, assistant coach
 John T. "Ike" Voedisch, assistant coach
 Tim Moynihan, assistant coach
 William B. Jones, freshman coach
 H. Manfred Vezie, freshman coach
 Rev. Michael A. Mulcaire, Chairman Athletic Board of Control

References

Notre Dame
Notre Dame Fighting Irish football seasons
College football national champions
College football undefeated seasons
Notre Dame Fighting Irish football